Dubki is a rural locality (a settlement) in Razdolyevskoye Rural Settlement, Kolchuginsky District, Vladimir Oblast, Russia. The population was 146 as of 2010. There are 2 streets.

Geography 
Dubki is located 15 km southeast of Kolchugino (the district's administrative centre) by road. 	Dubki (selo) is the nearest rural locality.

References 

Rural localities in Kolchuginsky District